"99" is a song by the American rock band Toto. The song appeared on the Hydra album in 1979. As a single, it reached number 26 on the Billboard charts. In Canada, the song peaked at number 17 on the RPM singles chart.

Development
The song was written as a tribute to George Lucas's film THX 1138, and the music video resembles a scene in the movie. 

In the video, as in the movie scene where the main character (named "THX 1138" and nicknamed "Thex") is imprisoned, the room is completely white and everyone is wearing a white jumpsuit. Toto Legend, the former official International Toto Fan Club newsletter, reviewed the video:
'99' was predominantly a performance video, though the set design was rather conceptual. Following David Paich's intention regarding the lyrics, about a sterile society in which names are forgotten and love forbidden, the set was sterile white, with various sized sculptured 99's hanging and standing about, and the band was clad in futuristic white jumpsuits. There were some notable shots in this one – keyboard close-ups and an artistic view of Jeff through a transparent drum head, a technique that several popular videos have copied since.

Reception
Record World  praised Paich's vocal and said that "Slick production wraps the  keyboard-laden love song in a perfect AOR-pop package."

Personnel

Toto
Bobby Kimball – backing vocals
Steve Lukather – guitars, lead and backing vocals
Steve Porcaro – keyboards
David Paich – keyboards, piano, backing vocals
David Hungate – bass
Jeff Porcaro – drums, percussion

Track listing
 "99" – (3:28)
 "Hydra"  – (5:04)

References

1979 songs
1980 singles
Columbia Records singles
Toto (band) songs
Science fiction music
Songs written by David Paich
Music videos directed by Bruce Gowers